Upsaaru, also known as Uppesaru, a kind of sambar in South India mainly in southern part of Karnataka state. It is a traditional food of South Karnataka.

Etymology
Upsaaru word is formed with combination of two words, namely uppu (salt) and saaru (soup) and main ingradients of Upsaaru are salt, water and small quantity of chilly powder. It is being prepared for long time in villages and is used to swallow Raagi mudde.

References

Desi cuisine
Karnataka cuisine
Vegetarian dishes of India
South Indian cuisine